Zarchuiyeh may refer to:
 Zarchuiyeh, Golzar, Bardsir County
 Zarchuiyeh, Jiroft